The 2002 United States Senate election in Minnesota took place on November 5, 2002. Incumbent Democratic U.S. Senator Paul Wellstone was running for reelection to a third term, but died in a plane crash eleven days before the election. The Democratic–Farmer–Labor Party (DFL) chose former Vice President and 1984 Presidential nominee Walter Mondale to replace Wellstone on the ballot. Mondale had previously held the seat from 1964 to 1976, resigning to take office as Vice President. He narrowly lost to Republican Norm Coleman, the former Mayor of Saint Paul. The day before the election, Governor Jesse Ventura appointed the 1996 Independence Party candidate, Dean Barkley, to serve the remainder of Wellstone's term. 

, this is the last time the Republicans won a U.S. Senate election in Minnesota. This is also the last time in a midterm election that the party controlling the White House flipped a Senate seat in a state they did not win in the preceding presidential election. This marked the first election that Mondale had lost in Minnesota, as he had even narrowly carried it against Ronald Reagan in his landslide defeat in the 1984 United States presidential election, where he lost 49 states, winning only Minnesota and the District of Columbia. As a result of his defeat in this election, Mondale became the first, and so far only, major party candidate in American history to have lost a general election in every state.

Primary elections

DFL 
Paul Wellstone* defeated Dick Franson 93% to 5%.

* Following Wellstone's death just prior to Election Day, the DFL Party nominated Walter Mondale as its replacement candidate.

Republican 
Norm Coleman defeated Jack Shepard 95% to 5%.

General election

Candidates on the ballot 
 Norm Coleman (R), former mayor of Saint Paul
 Walter Mondale (D), former Vice President of the United States
 Jim Moore (I), commercial banker from Minneapolis
 Paul Wellstone* (D), incumbent U.S. Senator
 Ray Tricomo (G), professor from Oakdale
 Miro Drago Kovatchevick (C), systems analyst from Minneapolis

* Wellstone appeared on the ballot despite his death (he had been replaced by Mondale)

Campaign 
Mondale campaigned on his experience, and promised to have students have a greater amount of education, more safety for seniors, and to  “continue Wellstone’s fight for people”. Coleman campaigned on more jobs, less taxes and promised to have “a brighter future for Minnesota” and to “help change the tone in Washington D.C”. 

At the time of his death, Wellstone was slightly ahead in the polls. After Mondale was chosen as the DFL candidate, he led 51% to 45% in a poll taken a few days before the election. Early on Election Day, Mondale was leading, but by nightfall Coleman pulled ahead, winning by 2.2 percentage points.

Debates
Complete video of debate, October 15, 2002
Complete video of debate, November 1, 2002
Complete video of debate, November 4, 2002

Predictions

Results

Aftermath 
After Coleman was declared the winner, Mondale conceded and said in his speech, "At the end of what will be my last campaign, I want to say to Minnesota, you always treated me well, you always listened to me." His loss, combined with his landslide defeat in the United States presidential election in 1984, made him the only American major-party candidate to lose a general election in all 50 states, as though George McGovern had also lost 49 states in the 1972 presidential election and lost the Massachusetts Democratic presidential primary in 1984, he never lost a general election in Massachussetts. Although Mondale did not seek office again, he remained active politically.

Coleman was sworn in on January 3, 2003. He served one term in the United States Senate, losing to Al Franken by a tiny margin in the 2008 election.

See also 
 2002 United States Senate elections

References 

Minnesota
2002
2002 Minnesota elections